A bronze statue of Mahatma Gandhi by Fredda Brilliant was unveiled in 1968 at the centre of Tavistock Square in London, to mark the impending centenary of Gandhi's birth in 1869. Mahatma Gandhi had studied law at University College London nearby from 1888 to 1891, before being called to the bar at the Inner Temple.

Description
The statue portrays Gandhi in his later years, sitting in a contemplative pose, with legs crossed in the lotus position and his left hand resting on his ankles, and his bare head with furrowed brows slightly lowered. He is wearing his characteristic dhoti loincloth, with a shawl over the right shoulder. The statue is mounted on a rounded Portland stone plinth, which stands on a square platform with four steps. The plinth bears the inscription "Mahatma Gandhi, 1869–1948". A large alcove hollowed out at the front of the plinth can house tributes, such as flowers or candles. A small plaque was added in 1996, to commemorate the 125th anniversary of Gandhi's birth two years earlier.

The Gandhi memorial was erected by the Mahatma Gandhi Memorial Committee, with the support and guidance of the India League. It was unveiled by the British Prime Minister Harold Wilson on 17 May 1968, in the presence of the first High Commissioner of India to the UK after independence, V. K. Krishna Menon, and the then-current High Commissioner of India to the United Kingdom, Shanti Swaroop Dhavan. It became a Grade II listed building in 1974.

Nearby in Tavistock Square is the Conscientious Objectors Commemorative Stone installed in 1994, a cherry tree planted in 1967 in memory of the victims of the bombing of Hiroshima and Nagasaki, and a bust of Dame Louisa Aldrich-Blake erected in 1926.

Maquettes
A large bronze maquette of the statue was shown on the BBC television programme Antiques Roadshow in April 2013, valued by Philip Mould at £20,000. Given an auctioneer's estimate of £800 to £1,200, the maquette was sold on 5 June 2019 for £52,000.

See also
 List of artistic depictions of Mahatma Gandhi

References

 Statue of Mahatma Gandhi in Tavistock Square Gardens, Historic England
 Statue of Mahatma Gandhi, Images of England, Historic England Archive
 Obituary: Fredda Brilliant. The Independent, 22 June 1999
 Gandhi statue, Bloomsbury, London Remembers
 Peace garden at Tavistock Square, atlasobscura.com

 Tavistock Square, Bedford Estates
 Tavistock Square Gardens, London Parks and Gardens Trust
 Golden Jubilee of Mahatma Gandhi statue at Tavistock Square, Asian Voice, 22 May 2018
 The Cambridge Companion to Gandhi, edited by Judith Brown, Anthony Parel, pp. 213–214
 Brilliant response to studio sale, Antiques Trade Gazette, 15 June 2019
 Gandhi bronze valued on Antiques Roadshow by Philip Mould to be sold at auction next month, Antiques Trade Gazette, 2019
 Maquette for bronze sculpture of Gandhi, Antiques Roadshow
 "The Studio of Fredda Brilliant, Woolley & Wallis, 16 May 2019
 Sale of bronze maquette, Woolley & Wallis, 5 June 2019
 Sale of plaster model, Woolley & Wallis, 5 June 2019
 Sale of resin model, Woolley & Wallis, 5 June 2019, Woolley & Wallis, 5 June 2019
 Sale of small bronze, Roseberys, 18 March 2014

1968 sculptures
London, Tavistock Square
Bronze sculptures in London
Outdoor sculptures in London
Sculptures of men in the United Kingdom
Monuments and memorials in London
Grade II listed buildings in the London Borough of Camden
Grade II listed statues in London